The main lakes within, or bordered by, Rwanda are as follows:

Lakes 

 Lake Kivu, between Rwanda and the Democratic Republic of Congo to the west, is by far the largest
 Lake Muhazi, about twenty kilometres east of Kigali: a long, narrow lake running roughly east–west and extending north and south into a number of tributary valleys
 Lake Ihema, in the Akagera National Park in the far east of the country, by the border with Tanzania
 Lake Rweru in the south-east, which is shared with Burundi
 Lake Burera, a mountain lake in the north (1862 metres above sea level)
 Lake Ruhondo, just to the south of Lake Burera, separated from it by a spine of hills
 Lake Mugesera, about 30 km south-east of Kigali, is a narrow lake consisting of five east–west bays joined at the western side
 Lake Cohoha South, south of Kigali on the border with Burundi

There are a number of smaller, shallow lakes in the flat, swampy region between Lake Mugesera and Lake Rweru.

See also

References
 The IUCN Directory of African Wetlands by Robert Mepham (Google-books link at )
 http://www.gov.rw/government/geography.html

Rwanda
Lakes